Amanda Caroline Howe  is a British medical doctor who works as a general practitioner and is a Professor of Primary Care. She is a former President of the Royal College of General Practitioners (RCGP) and a former President of the World Organization of Family Doctors (WONCA).

Early career
She studied at the University of London and Newnham College, Cambridge.

Since her graduation in 1984, Howe has worked as a GP. She was a partner at the Foxhill Medical Centre in Sheffield between the years of 1984–2001. She now practises one day a week at the Bowthorpe Medical Centre in Norwich, England.

Academic medicine
In 1992, Howe became a lecturer. In 2001, as Norwich Medical School was being established, Howe became a Professor of Primary Care at the University of East Anglia.

At the RCGP, Howe was Chair of Research from 2000−2005. She was chair of the Society for Academic Primary Care from 2007–2010. She was elected RCGP Honorary Secretary in 2009. She became a vice-chair of RCGP council in 2013 and following this led on professional development, continuing her work as chairwoman of the RCGP workforce committee.

In June 2013, Howe was elected as President-elect of WONCA and in 2016 became the first woman to be President of WONCA.

In June 2019, she was elected president of the RCGP, taking over from Mayur Lakhani in November 2019 for a two-year term.

She is a fellow of the RCGP and the Academy of Medical Sciences. She was appointed Officer of the Order of the British Empire (OBE) in the 2016 New Year Honours for services to primary care.

References

Year of birth missing (living people)
Living people
Alumni of the University of London
Alumni of Newnham College, Cambridge
Academics of the University of East Anglia
20th-century English medical doctors
21st-century English medical doctors
British general practitioners
Fellows of the Academy of Medical Sciences (United Kingdom)
Fellows of the Royal College of General Practitioners
Officers of the Order of the British Empire